Tony Lumpkin in Town is a 1778 Irish play by John O'Keeffe. An afterpiece, it was intended as a sequel to the 1773 play She Stoops to Conquer by Oliver Goldsmith. It is centred on the character Tony Lumpkin. It ran successfully at the Haymarket Theatre in London.

References

Bibliography
 Hager, Alan. Encyclopedia of British Writers: 16th, 17th & 18th Centuries. Book Builders, 2005.

Plays by John O'Keeffe
1778 plays
Plays set in the 18th century
West End plays